This article details the order of battle of German military units during the invasion of Poland in 1939.

The German army's forces for the invasion of Poland (codename Fall Weiss, English - "Case White") were divided into Army Group North (consisting of the German 3rd and 4th armies) and Army Group South (consisting of the German 8th, 10th, and 14th armies, and the Slovak Army Group Bernolak).

Army Group C was on the western border of Germany defending against a potential French attack.  This order of battle is for 04:47 on September 1, after which things started to get shuffled.

Oberkommando des Heeres 
Oberkommando des Heeres was the High Command of the Heer.  It controlled everything related to the Heer:  Personnel, Training, Recruitment, Armaments, Transportation, Supplies, Medical Services, etc.  An ongoing problem was that each service branch was its own "kingdom" resulting in massive inefficiency.

Oberbefehlshaber des Heeres Generaloberst Walter von Brauchitsch

 Chef des Generalstab des Heeres General der Artillerie Franz Halder
 Chief of the General Staff of the Army was the head of all of the departments of the Heer except for the armaments section and the replacement army.
 Chef der Heeresrüstung und Befehlshaber des Ersatzheeres General der Artillerie Friedrich "Fritz" Fromm
 Chief of Armaments and Commander of the Replacement Army controlled all army procurement and production, and all of the troops within Germany who were replacements for front line units.

Heeresgruppe Nord 

Generaloberst Fedor von Bock

Heeresgruppe Nord's initial objectives were to capture the "Polish corridor" (4. Armee) and drive southwards towards Warsaw from East Prussia (3. Armee)

Army Group Reserve Troops
Directly subordinated to Heeresgruppe Nord

 10. Panzer-Division (Generalleutnant Ferdinand Schaal)
 Panzer-Regiment 8
 Infanterie-Regiment (mot.) 86, II./ 
 Artillerie-Regiment (mot.) 29
 I./ Aufklärungs-Regiment 8
 73. Infanterie-Division (Generalleutnant Dr.phil.h.c. Friedrich von Rabenau)
 Infanterie-Regiment 170, 186, 213
 Artillerie-Regiment 173
 206. Infanterie-Division (Generalmajor Hugo Höfl)
 Infanterie-Regiment 301, 312, 413
 Artillerie-Regiment 206
 208. Infanterie-Division (Generalmajor Moritz Andreas)
 Infanterie-Regiment 309, 337, 338
 Artillerie-Regiment 208

3. Armee

3. Armee was based in East Prussia
General der Artillerie Georg von Küchler

 3. Armee Reserves
 217. Infanterie-Division (Generalmajor Richard Baltzer)
 Infanterie-Regiment 311, 346, 389
 Artillerie-Regiment 217
 1. Kavallerie-Division (Oberst Kurt Feldt)
 Reiter-Regiment 1, 2
 Radfahr-Abteilung 1
 reitende Artillerie-Abteilung 1
 I. Armeekorps
 Generalleutnant Walter Petzel m.F.b.
 11. Infanterie-Division (Generalleutnant Max Bock)
 Infanterie-Regiment 2, 23, 44
 Artillerie-Regiment 11
 61. Infanterie-Division (Char. Generalleutnant z.V. Siegfried Haenicke)
 Infanterie-Regiment 151, 162, 176
 Artillerie-Regiment 161
 Panzerverband Ostpreußen (AKA Panzer-Division Kempf) (Generalmajor Werner Kempf)
 Panzer-Regiment 7
 SS-Standard (mot.) "Deutschland"
 SS-Artillerie-Standart/SS-TV
 Grenzschutzabschnittskommando 15 (Generalmajor Wolf Schede)
  4 Grenzwacht-Regiments
 XXI. Armeekorps
 Generalleutnant Nikolaus von Falkenhorst
 I./ Panzer-Regiment 10 (Oberstleutnant Friedrich-Wilhelm Sieberg)
 21. Infanterie-Division (Generalleutnant Kuno-Hans von Both)
 Infanterie-Regiment 3, 24, 45
 Artillerie-Regiment 21
 228. Infanterie-Division (Generalmajor Hans Suttner)
 Infanterie-Regiment 325, 356, 400
 Artillerie-Regiment 228
 Führungsstab z.b.V. 1 (also known as Kommandostab Wodrig, Korps Wodrig)
 Generalleutnant Albert Wodrig
 1. Infanterie-Division (Generalmajor Joachim von Kortzfleisch)
 Infanterie-Regiment 1, 22, 43
 Artillerie-Regiment 1
 12. Infanterie-Division (Generalleutnant Ludwig von der Leyen)
 Infanterie-Regiment 27, 48, 89
 Artillerie-Regiment 12
 Gruppe Brand
 Generalmajor Albrecht Brand
 Kommandantur der Befestigungen bei Königsberg Albrecht Brand
 Infanterie-Regiment "Gumbinnen"
 Landwehr-Infanterie-Regiment 152
 2 Grenzwacht-Regiments
 Brigade Goldap (Oberst Hans-Erich Nolte)
 IV./ Landwehr-Infanterie-Regiment 161
 II./ Landwehr-Infanterie-Regiment 162
 II./ Landwehr-Artillerie-Regiment 161
 Brigade Lötzen (Generalmajor Otto-Ernst Ottenbacher)
 Landwehr-Infanterie-Regiment 161, 162
 Landwehr-Artillerie-Regiment 161
 1 Grenzwacht-Regiment

4. Armee 

4. Armee was based in Western Pomerania
General der Artillerie Günther von Kluge

 4. Armee Reserves
 23. Infanterie-Division (Generalleutnant Walter Graf von Brockdorff-Ahlefeldt)
 Infanterie-Regiment 9, 67, 68
 Artillerie-Regiment 23
 218. Infanterie-Division (Generalmajor Woldemar Freiherr Grote)
 Infanterie-Regiment 323, 386, 397
 Artillerie-Regiment 218
 Grenzschutzabschnittskommando 1 (General der Flieger z.V. Leonhard Kaupisch)
 2 Grenzwacht-Regiments
 207. Infanterie-Division (Generalmajor Karl von Tiedemann)
 Infanterie-Regiment 322, 368, 374
 Artillerie-Regiment 207
 Grenzschutzabschnittskommando 2 (Char. Generalleutnant Friedrich (Fritz) Büchs)
 4 Grenzwacht-Regiments
 Grenzschutzabschnittskommando 12 (Generalmajor z.V. Hermann Metz)
 Grenz-Infanterie-Regiment "Crossen", "Meseritz", "Schwerin"
 3 Grenzwacht-Regiments
 II. Armeekorps
 General der Infanterie Adolf Strauß
 3. Infanterie-Division (Generalmajor Walter Lichel)
 Infanterie-Regiment 8, 29, 50
 Artillerie-Regiment 3
 32. Infanterie-Division (Generalleutnant Franz Böhme)
 Infanterie-Regiment 4, 94, 96
 Artillerie-Regiment 32
 III. Armeekorps
 General der Artillerie Curt Haase
 50. Infanterie-Division (Generalleutnant Konrad Sorsche)
 Grenz-Infanterie-Regiment 121, 122, 123
 schw. Artillerie-Abteilung (mot.) 101
 Brigade Netze (Generalmajor Eccard Freiherr von Gablenz)
 2 Grenzwacht-Regiments
 XIX. Armeekorps
 General der Panzertruppe Heinz Guderian
 3. Panzer-Division (Generalleutnant Leo Freiherr Geyr von Schweppenburg)
 3. Panzer-Brigade (Panzer-Regiment 5, 6), Panzer-Lehr-Abteilung
 3. Schützen-Brigade (Schützen-Regiment 3)
 Artillerie-Regiment 75 (mot.)
 2. Infanterie-Division (mot.) (Generalleutnant Paul Bader)
 Infanterie-Regiment 5 (mot.), 25 (mot.), 92 (mot.)
 Artillerie-Regiment 2 (mot.)
 20. Infanterie-Division (mot.) (Generalleutnant Mauritz von Wiktorin)
 Infanterie-Regiment 69 (mot.), 76 (mot.), 80 (mot.)
 Artillerie-Regiment 56 (mot.)

Heeresgruppe Süd 

Generaloberst Gerd von Rundstedt

Heeresgruppe Süd's initial objective was to drive from Silesia towards Warsaw (by 8. Armee and 10. Armee), and to destroy the Polish forces around Kraków (by 14. Armee)

Army Group Reserve Troops 
Directly subordinated to Heeresgruppe Süd

 56. Infanterie-Division (Generalmajor Karl Kriebel)
 Infanterie-Regiment 92, 171, 234
 Artillerie-Regiment 156
 57. Infanterie-Division (Generalmajor Oskar Blümm)
 Infanterie-Regiment 179, 199, 217
 Artillerie-Regiment 157
 252. Infanterie-Division (Char. Generallutnant z.V. Diether von Boehm-Bezing)
 Infanterie-Regiment 452, 461, 472
 Artillerie-Regiment 252
 257. Infanterie-Division (Generalleutnant Max von Viebahn)
 Infanterie-Regiment 457, 466, 477
 Artillerie-Regiment 257
 258. Infanterie-Division (Generalmajor Walter Wollmann)
 Infanterie-Regiment 458, 478, 479
 Artillerie-Regiment 258
 VII. Armeekorps (General der Infanterie Eugen Ritter von Schobert)
 27. Infanterie-Division (Generalleutnant Friedrich Bergmann)
 Infanterie-Regiment 40, 63, 91
 Artillerie-Regiment 27
 68. Infanterie-Division (Oberst Georg Braun m.F.b.)
 Infanterie-Regiment 169, 188, 196
 Artillerie-Regiment 168
 XXII. Armeekorps (General der Kavallerie z.V. Ewald von Kleist)
 62nd Infantry Division (General Walter Keiner)
 Infanterie-Regiment 164, 183, 190
 213th Infantry Division (General Rene de l'Homme de Courbiere)
 Infanterie-Regiment 318, 354, 406
 221st Infantry Division (General Johann Pflugbeil)
 Infanterie-Regiment 350, 360, 375
 Enroute
 1. Gebirgs-Division (Generalmajor Ludwig Kübler)
 Gebirgs-Jäger-Regiment 98, 99, 100
 Gebirgs-Artillerie-Regiment 79
 2. Gebirgs-Division (Generalleutnant Valentin Feurstein)
 Gebirgs-Jäger-Regiment 136, 137
 Gebirgs-Artillerie-Regiment 111

8. Armee 

8. Armee was based in northern Silesia
General der Infanterie Johannes Blaskowitz

 8. Armee Reserves
 30. Infanterie-Division (Generalleutnant Kurt von Briesen)
 Infanterie-Regiment 6, 26, 46
 Artillerie-Regiment 30
 Grenzschutzabschnittskommando 13 (Generalleutnant z.V. Max von Schenckendorff)
 2 Grenzwacht-Regiments
 Grenzschutzabschnittskommando 14 (Char. General der Kavallerie z.V. Kurt Ludwig Freiherr von Gienanth)
 Landwehr-Infanterie-Regiment 183
 2 Grenzwacht-Regiments
 X. Armeekorps
 General der Artillerie z.V. Wilhelm Ulex
 24. Infanterie-Division (Generalleutnant Friedrich Olbricht)
 Infanterie-Regiment 31, 32, 102
 Artillerie-Regiment 24
 XIII. Armeekorps
 General der Kavallerie Maximilian Reichsfreiherr von und zu Weichs an der Glon
 10. Infanterie-Division (Generalleutnant Conrad von Cochenhausen)
 Infanterie-Regiment 20, 41, 85
 Artillerie-Regiment 10
 17. Infanterie-Division (Generalmajor Herbert Loch)
 Infanterie-Regiment 21, 55, 95
 Artillerie-Regiment 17
 SS-Infanterie-Regiment (mot.) „Leibstandarte SS Adolf Hitler" (SS-Oberstgruppenführer Josef "Sepp" Dietrich).

10. Armee 

10. Armee was based in southern Silesia
General der Artillerie Walter von Reichenau

 10. Armee Reserves
 1. leichte Division (Generalmajor Friedrich-Wilhelm von Loeper)
 Panzer-Regiment 11, Panzer-Abteilung 65, 6
 Schützen-Brigade (Schützen-Regiment 4)
 Artillerie-Regiment 76 (mot.)
 IV. Armeekorps
 General der Infanterie Viktor von Schwedler
 4. Infanterie-Division (Generalleutnant Erik-Oskar Hansen)
 Infanterie-Regiment 10, 52, 103
 Artillerie-Regiment 4
 46. Infanterie-Division (Generalmajor Paul von Hase)
 Infanterie-Regiment 42, 72, 97
 Artillerie-Regiment 115
 XI. Armeekorps
 General der Artillerie Emil Leeb
 18. Infanterie-Division (Generalmajor Friedrich-Carl Cranz)
 Infanterie-Regiment 30, 51, 54
 Artillerie-Regiment 18
 19. Infanterie-Division (Generalleutnant Günther Schwantes)
 Infanterie-Regiment 59, 73, 74
 Artillerie-Regiment 19
 XIV. Armeekorps (mot.)
 General der Infanterie Gustav von Wietersheim
 13. Infanterie-Division (mot.) (Generalleutnant Moritz von Faber du Faur m.F.b.)
 Infanterie-Regiment 33 (mot.), 66 (mot.), 93 (mot.)
 Artillerie-Regiment 13 (mot.)
 29th Motorized Division (Generalleutnant Joachim Lemelsen)
 Infanterie-Regiment 15 (mot.), 71 (mot.)
 Artillerie-Regiment 29 (mot.)
 XV. Armeekorps (mot.)
 General der Infanterie Hermann Hoth
 2. leichte Division (Generalleutnant Georg Stumme)
 Panzer-Abteilung 66
 Kavallerie-Schützen-Regiment 6, 7
 Artillerie-Regiment 78 (mot.)
 3. leichte Division (Generalmajor Adolf-Friedrich Kuntzen)
 Panzer-Abteilung 67
 Kavallerie-Schützen-Regiment 8, 9
 Artillerie-Regiment 80 (mot.)
 XVI. Armeekorps (mot.)
 General der Kavallerie Erich Höpner
 1. Panzer-Division (Generalleutnant Rudolf Schmidt)
 1. Panzer-Brigade (Panzer-Regiment 1, 2)
 1. Schützen-Brigade (Schützen-Regiment 1)
 Artillerie-Regiment 73 (mot.)
 4. Panzer-Division (Generalmajor Georg-Hans Reinhardt)
 5. Panzer-Brigade (Panzer-Regiment 35, 36)
 Schützen-Regiment 12
 Artillerie-Regiment 103 (mot.)
 14. Infanterie-Division (Generalleutnant Peter Weyer)
 Infanterie-Regiment 11, 53, 116
 Artillerie-Regiment 14
 31. Infanterie-Division (Generalleutnant Rudolf Kämpfe)
 Infanterie-Regiment 12, 17, 82
 Artillerie-Regiment 31

14. Armee 

14. Armee was based in Moravia and Slovakia
Generaloberst Wilhelm List

 14. Armee Reserves
 239. Infanterie-Division (Generalmajor Ferdinand Neuling)
 Infanterie-Regiment 327, 372, 444
 Artillerie-Regiment 239
 Grenzschutzabschnittskommando 3 (Generalleutnant z.V. Georg Brandt)
 3 Grenzwacht-Regiments
 Grenzschutzabschnittskommando 30 (Generalmajor Erwin Engelbrecht)
 III./ Infanterie-Regiment 135
 III./ Gebirgsjäger-Regiment 100
 I./ Gebirgsjäger-Regiment 137
 VIII. Armeekorps
 General der Infanterie Ernst Busch
 5. Panzer-Division (Generalleutnant Heinrich von Vietinghoff genannt Scheel)
 8. Panzer-Brigade (Panzer-Regiment 15, 31)
 Schützen-Regiment 13 (mot.), 14 (mot.)
 Artillerie-Regiment 116 (mot.)
 8. Infanterie-Division (Generalleutnant Rudolf Koch-Erpach)
 Infanterie-Regiment 28, 38, 84
 Artillerie-Regiment 8
 28. Infanterie-Division (Generalleutnant Hans von Obstfelder
 Consisted of the 7th, 49th, and 83rd Infantry Regiments
 239th Infantry Division (Commanded by General Ferdinand Neuling)
 Infanterie-Regiment 7, 49, 83
 Artillerie-Regiment 28
 SS-Standart (mot.) "Germania" (SS-Standartenführer Karl-Maria Demelhuber)
 XVII. Armeekorps
 General der Infanterie Werner Kienitz
 7. Infanterie-Division (Generalmajor Eugen Ott)
 Infanterie-Regiment 19, 61, 62
 Artillerie-Regiment 7
 44. Infanterie-Division (Generalleutnant Albrecht Schubert)
 Infanterie-Regiment 131, 132, 134
 Artillerie-Regiment 96
 45. Infanterie-Division (Generalleutnant Friedrich Materna)
 Infanterie-Regiment 130, 133, 135
 Artillerie-Regiment 98
 XVIII. Armeekorps
 General der Infanterie Eugen Beyer
 2. Panzer-Division (Generalleutnant Rudolf Veiel)
 2. Panzer-Brigade (Panzer-Regiment 3, 4)
 2. Schützen-Brigade (Schützen-Regiment 2)
 Artillerie-Regiment 74 (mot.)
 4. leichte Division (Generalmajor Dr.iur. Alfred Ritter von Hubicki)
 Panzer-Abteilung 33
 Kavallerie-Schützen-Regiment 10, 11
 Artillerie-Regiment 102 (mot.)
 3. Gebirgs-Division (Generalmajor Eduard Dietl)
 Gebirgs-Jäger-Regiment 138, 139
 Gebirgs-Artillery-Regiment 112

Slovak Army Bernolak
See Slovak invasion of Poland
 Polní armáda "Bernolák" (Field Army Bernolak)
 Generál 1. třídy Ferdinand Čatloš
 1. Divise "Jánošík" (Generál 2. třídy Antonin Pulanich)
 Pěší pluk 1, 4, 6
 Dělostřelecký pluk 1.
 2. Divise "Škultéty" (Podplukovník Ján Imro, (09.05.1939 Generál 2. třídy Alexandr Čunderlik))
 Pěší pluk 3
 Dělostřelecký pluk 2
 3. Divise "Rázus" (Plukovník Augustín Malár)
 Pěší pluk 2, 21
 Dělostřelecký pluk 3, 4
 Pěší pluk 5

 Undergoing Organization and Training
 Infanterie-Regiment Großdeutschland (Oberstleutnant Hunold von Stockhausen).

Heeresgruppe C 

Char. Generaloberst z.V. Wilhelm Ritter von Leeb

Heeresgruppe C's only duty was to protect the western border of Germany from any French attacks until stronger units could be sent back from the east.  It was accomplished by deception.  The units were generally under strength, most of the infantry unit were missing their heavy weapons platoons, and some entire battalions. There was almost no mobility, except for horses and bicycles.  Some of the units were headquarters only to give the impression of a larger presence.

Army Group Reserve Troops
Directly subordinated to Heeresgruppe C

 76. Infanterie-Division (Generalmajor Maximilian de Angelis)

German High Command Reserve

 251. Infanterie-Division (Generalleutnant Hans Kratzert)
 253. Infanterie-Division (Generalleutnant z.V. Friedrich "Fritz" Kühne)
 254. Infanterie-Division (Char. Generalleutnant z.V. Friedrich "Fritz" Koch)
 255. Infanterie-Division (Generalmajor Wilhelm Wetzel)
 256. Infanterie-Division (Generalmajor Josef Folttmann)
 260. Infanterie-Division (Char. Generalleutnant z.V. Hans Schmidt)
 262. Infanterie-Division (Generalmajor Edgar Theisen)
 263. Infanterie-Division (Generalmajor Franz Karl)
 267. Infanterie-Division (Char. General der Panzertruppe z.V. Ernst Feßmann)
 268. Infanterie-Division (Generalmajor Erich Straube)
 269. Infanterie-Division (Generalmajor Ernst Eberhard Hell)

5. Armee 

5. Armee was based along the Luxembourg and Belgium border
General der Infanterie z.V. Curt Liebmann 

 5. Armee Reserves
 58. Infanterie-Division (Generalmajor Iwan Heunert)
 87. Infanterie-Division (Generalmajor Bogislav von Studnitz)
 V. Armeekorps
 General der Infanterie Richard Ruoff
 22. Infanterie-Division (Generalmajor Hans Graf von Sponeck)
 225. Infanterie-Division (Generalleutnant Ernst Schaumburg)
 VI. Armeekorps 
 General der Pioniere Otto-Wilhelm Förster
 1 Grenz-Infanterie-Regiment
 XXVII. Armeekorps
 Char. General der Infanterie z.V. Karl Ritter von Prager 
 16. Infanterie-Division (Generalleutnant Gotthard Heinrici)
 69. Infanterie-Division (Oberst Hermann Tittel)
 211. Infanterie-Division (Generalmajor Kurt Renner)
 216. Infanterie-Division (Char. Generalleutnant Hermann Boettcher)
 XXX. Armeekorps
 Generalleutnant Otto Hartmann
 Generalkommando der Grenztruppen Eifel (General der Infanterie Erich Raschick) (later XXIII. Armeekorps)
 26. Infanterie-Division (Generalleutnant Sigismund von Förster)
 86. Infanterie-Division (Generalmajor Joachim Witthöft)
 227. Infanterie-Division (Oberst Friedrich Zickwolff m.F.b.)
 Grenz-Division Trier (Generalmajor Franz Mattenklott) (later 72. Infanterie-Division {19. September})
 Grenzschutzabschnittskommando 9 (Oberst Hans von Sommerfeld)

1. Armee 

1. Armee was based along the French border
General der Infanterie Erwin von Witzleben

 1. Armee Reserves
 75. Infanterie-Division (Generalmajor Ing. Ernst Hammer)
 29. Infanterie-Division (Generalmajor Hans Stengel)
 214. Infanterie-Division (Generalmajor Theodor Groppe)
 209. Infanterie-Division (Generalmajor Hans Stengel)
 223. Infanterie-Division (Generalmajor Paul-Willi Körner)
 231. Infanterie-Division (Generalmajor Hans Schönhärl)
 246. Infanterie-Division (Generalmajor Erich Denecke)
 IX. Armeekorps
 General der Infanterie z.V. Hermann Geyer
 25. Infanterie-Division (Generalleutnant Christian Hansen)
 33. Infanterie-Division (Generalleutnant Hermann Ritter von Speck)
 71. Infanterie-Division (Generalmajor Wolfgang Ziegler)
 XII. Armeekorps
 General der Infanterie Walter Schroth
 15. Infanterie-Division (Generalmajor Walter Behschnitt)
 34. Infanterie-Division (Generalmajor Hans Behlendorff)
 52. Infanterie-Division (Generalmajor Karl-Adolf Hollidt)
 79. Infanterie-Division (Generalmajor Karl Strecker)
 Grenzkommandantur Sankt Wendel (Generalmajor Karl Weisenberger)
 Generalkommando der Grenztruppen Saarpfalz (General der Pioniere Walter Kuntze) (later XXIV. Armeekorps)
 6. Infanterie-Division (Generalleutnant Arnold Freiherr von Biegeleben)
 9. Infanterie-Division (Generalleutnant Georg von Apell)
 36. Infanterie-Division (Generalleutnant Georg Lindemann)

7. Armee 

7. Armee was based along the French border
General der Artillerie Friedrich Dollmann

 7. Armee Reserves
 78. Infanterie-Division (Generalleutnant Friedrich Brand)
 212. Infanterie-Division (Generalmajor Walter Friedrichs geboren Ochsenmayer)
 215. Infanterie-Division (Generalmajor Baptist Knieß)
 Generalkommando der Grenztruppen Oberrhein (later XXV. Armeekorps)
 General der Infanterie Alfred Wäger 
 5. Infanterie-Division (Generalleutnant Wilhelm Fahrmbacher)
 35. Infanterie-Division (Generalmajor Hans Wolfgang Reinhard)
 14. Landwehr-Division (Generalmajor Ernst Richter) (later 205. Infanterie-Division)
 SS-Standart (mot.) "Der Führer" (SS-Oberführer Georg Keppler)

Supporting forces

Luftwaffe
Luftwaffe - Oberbefehlshaber der Luftwaffe Generalfeldmarschall Hermann Göring

Chef der Generalstabes der Luftwaffe - Oberst Hans Jeschonnek
Luftflotte 1 - Commanded by General der Flieger Albert Kesselring.  Supporting Heeresgruppe Nord.
1. Flieger-Division - Generalmajor Ulrich Grauert, Commanding:
I./ Kampfgeschwader 1, II./ Kampfgeschwader 26, Kampfgeschwader 27, I./ Kampfgeschwader 53, I./ Kampfgeschwader 152, Sturzkampfgeschwader 2, IV.(Stuka)/ Lehrgeschwader 1, I.(Jagd)/ Lehrgeschwader 2, Zerstörergeschwader 1
Luftgau-Kommando I (Königsberg) - Generalmajor Walter Mußhoff, Commanding:  I./ Jagdgeschwader 1, I./ Jagdgeschwader 21
Luftgau-Kommando III (Berlin) - Generalmajor Hubert Weise, Commanding:  I./ Jagdgeschwader 2
Luftgau-Kommando IV (Dresden) - Generalmajor Wilhelm Mayer, Commanding:  I./ Jagdgeschwader 3, I./ Jagdgeschwader 20
Luftwaffenkommando Ostpreußen - Generalleutnant Wilhelm Wimmer, Commanding
Kampfgeschwader 3, I./ Sturzkampfgeschwader 1
Lehr-Division - Generalmajor Helmut Förster, Commanding: Lehrgeschwader 1 (3 Kampf Gruppe), Kampfgeschwader 2
Luftflotte 2 - Commanded by General der Flieger Hellmuth Felmy.  Supporting Heeresgruppe C.
3. Flieger-Division - Generalmajor Richard Putzier, Commanding:
I./ Kampfgeschwader 25, II./ Kampfgeschwader 28, I./ Kampfgeschwader 54
4. Flieger-Division - General der Flieger Alfred Keller, Commanding:
I./ Kampfgeschwader 26, Kampfgeschwader 27, Kampfgeschwader 55
Luftgau-Kommando VI (Münster) - Generalmajor August Schmidt, Commanding: Jagdgeschwader 26, I./ Jagdgeschwader 52, II./ Zerstörergeschwader 26
Luftgau-Kommando XI (Hannover) - General der Flieger Ludwig Wolff, Commanding:  II./ Jagdgeschwader 77, Zerstörergeschwader 26
Luftflotte 3 - Commanded by General der Flieger Hugo Sperrle.  Supporting Heeresgruppe C.
5. Flieger-Division - Generalmajor Robert Ritter von Greim, Commanding:
Kampfgeschwader 51, I./ Zerstörergeschwader 52
6. Flieger-Division - Generalmajor Otto Deßloch, Commanding:
Kampfgeschwader 53, III./ Sturzkampfgeschwader 51, II./ Zerstörergeschwader 76
Luftgau-Kommando VII (München) - Generalleutnant Emil Zenetti, Commanding:  I./ Jagdgeschwader 51, I./ Jagdgeschwader 71
Luftgau-Kommando XII (Wiesbaden) - Generalmajor Friedrich Heiligenbrunner, Commanding: Jagdgeschwader 53
Luftgau-Kommando XIII (Nürnberg) - Generalmajor Dr. Eugen Weißmann, Commanding:  I./ Jagdgeschwader 70
Luftflotte 4 - Commanded by General der Flieger Alexander Löhr.  Supporting Heeresgruppe Süd.
2. Flieger-Division - Generalmajor Bruno Loerzer, Commanding:
Kampfgeschwader 4, Kampfgeschwader 76, Kampfgeschwader 77, I./ Sturzkampfgeschwader 2, I./ Zerstörergeschwader 76
Fliegerführer z.b.V. - Generalmajor Wolfram Freiherr von Richthofen, Commanding:
II.(Schlacht)/ Lehrgeschwader 2, I./ Sturzkampfgeschwader 76, Sturzkampfgeschwader 77, I./ Zerstörergeschwader 2
Luftgau-Kommando VIII (Breslau) - Generalmajor Bernhard Waber, Commanding:  I./ Jagdgeschwader 76, I./ Jagdgeschwader 77
Luftgau-Kommando XVII (Wien) - Generalmajor Friedrich Hirschauer, Commanding
7. Fliegerdivision - Generalmajor Kurt Student, Commanding: 
Fallschirmjäger-Regiment 1, 2, Kampfgeschwader z.b.V. 1, Kampfgruppe z.b.V. 9
16. Luftlande-Infanterie-Regiment of the 22. Infanterie-Division

Kriegsmarine
On August 30 the Polish Navy, realizing what was about to happen, sent three destroyers (Błyskawica, Grom, and Burza) to the UK. The group was spotted the 30th in the southern Baltic Sea by U 31 and again, in the Skagerrak, by U 19 on 31 August. Since the war hadn't started they were unmolested. With the destroyers gone some of the ships deployed to the Baltic were recalled and some sent to the North Sea (Nordsee). The fleet was in the process of shifting its deployment when the war broke out. Later, the submarines Orzeł and Wilk also made it to the UK, while the Sęp, Ryś and Żbik, sought internment in Sweden.

Kriegsmarine - Oberbefehlshaber der Kriegsmarine Generaladmiral Erich Raeder

 Chef des Stabes der Seekriegsleitung (Skl) - Konteradmiral Otto Schniewind
 Chef der Flotte / Flottenchef - Admiral Hermann Boehm
 Befehlshaber der Panzerschiffe - Vizeadmiral Wilhelm Marschall
 Befehlshaber der Aufklärungsstreitkräfte - Vizeadmiral Hermann Densch
 Führer der Torpedoboote - Konteradmiral Günter Lütjens
 Führer der Unterseeboote - Kapitän zur See Karl Dönitz
 Führer der Unterseeboote West - Kapitän zur See Karl Dönitz
 Führer der Unterseeboote Ost - Fregattenkapitän Oskar Schomburg

Under Direct Control of Seekriegsleitung (Skl)

 Admiral Graf Spee (Panzerschiff) - Kapitän zur See Hans Langsdorff: en route to South Atlantic
 Deutschland {Panzerschiff} - Kapitän zur See Paul Wenneker: North Atlantic
 Altmark (Troßschiff) - Kapitänleutnant der Reserve Heinrich Dau: operating with ADMIRAL GRAF SPEE
 Westerwald {Troßschiff} - Korvettenkapitän R. Peter Grau: operating with DEUTSCHLAND
 U 27 - Kapitänleutnant Johannes Franz: North Atlantic
 U 28 - Kapitänleutnant Günter Kuhnke: North Atlantic
 U 29 - Kapitänleutnant Otto Schuhart: North Atlantic
 U 30 - Kapitänleutnant Fritz-Juluis Lemp: North Atlantic
 U 33 - Kapitänleutnant Hans-Wilhelm von Dresky: North Atlantic
 U 34 - Kapitänleutnant Wilhelm Rollman: North Atlantic
 U 37 - Kapitänleutnant Heinrich Schuch: North Atlantic
 U 38 - Kapitänleutnant Heinrich Liebe: North Atlantic
 U 39 - Kapitänleutnant Gerhard Glattes: North Atlantic
 U 40 - Kapitänleutnant Werner von Schmidt: North Atlantic
 U 41 - Kapitänleutnant Gustav-Adolf Mugler: North Atlantic
 U 45 - Kapitänleutnant Alexander Gelhaar: North Atlantic
 U 46 - Kapitänleutnant Herbert Sohler: North Atlantic
 U 47 - Korvettenkapitän Gunther Prien: North Atlantic
 U 48 - Kapitänleutnant Herbert Schultze: North Atlantic
 U 52 - Kapitänleutnant Wolfgang Barten: North Atlantic

Marinegruppenkommando West

Oberbefehlshaber Marinegruppenkommando  West - Admiral Alfred Saalwächter

 Kommandierender Admiral der Marinestation der Nordsee - Admiral Rolf Carls
 Führer der Unterseeboote West - Kapitän zur See Karl Dönitz
 At sea (North Sea)
Nürnberg (light cruiser) - Kapitän zur See Otto Klüber (Flag Befehlshaber der Aufklärungsstreitkräfte - Vizeadmiral Hermann Densch)
 Köln (light cruiser) - Kapitän zur See Theodor Burchardi 
 Königsberg (light cruiser) - Kapitän zur See Kurt Caesar Hoffmann
 Leipzig (light cruiser) - Kapitän zur See Heinz Nordmann
 U 9 - Kapitänleutnant Ludwig Mathes
 U 12 - Kapitänleutnant Dietrich von der Ropp
 U 15 - Kapitänleutnant Heinz Buchholz
 U 17 - Kapitänleutnant Heinz von Reiche
 U 19 - Kapitänleutnant Hans Meckel
 U 21 - Kapitänleutnant Fritz Frauenheim
 U 23 - Kapitänleutnant Otto Kretschmer
 U 26 - Korvettenkapitän Klaus Ewerth
 U 36 - Kapitänleutnant Wilhelm Fröhlich
 U 56 - Kapitänleutnant Wilhelm Zahn
 U 58 - Kapitänleutnant Herbert Kuppisch
 U 59 - Kapitänleutnant Harald Jurst
 At Wilhelmshaven
Scharnhorst {Schlachtschiff} - Kapitän zur See Otto Ciliax:  Kriegsmarinewerft for modifications
 Admiral Scheer {Panzerschiff} - Kapitän zur See Hans-Heinrich Wurmbach
 Emden (light cruiser) - Kapitän zur See Werner Lange
 Karlsruhe (light cruiser) - Kapitän zur See Friedrirch Rieve: refitting
2. Zerstörerflottille - Kapitän zur See Friedrich Bonte:
Paul Jakobi (Z 5) - Korvettenkapitän Hans G. Zimmer:  refitting (Flag 2. Zerstörerflottille)
 Theodor Riedel (Z 6) - Korvettenkapitän Gerhardt Bohmig
 Hermann Schoemann (Z 7) - Korvettenkapitän Theodor Detmers
 Karl Galster (Z 20) - Korvettenkapitän Theodor Bechtolsheim
4. Zerstörerflottille - Fregattenkapitän Erich Bey:
Hans Lody (Z 10) - Korvettenkapitän Hubert Freiherr von Wagenheim (Flag 4. Zerstörerflottille)
5. Zerstörerdivision - Korvettenkapitän Herbert Friedrichs:
Dieter von Roeder (Z 17) - Korvettenkapitän Erich Holtorf
Hans Lüdemann (Z 18) - Korvettenkapitän Herbert Friedrichs (Flag 5. Zerstörerdivision)
6. Torpedobootsflottille - Korvettenkapitän Georg Waue:
Iltis - Kapitänleutnant Heinz Schuur
Jaguar - Kapitänleutnant Franz Kolhauf
Leopard - Kapitänleutnant Karl Kassbaum (Flag 6. Torpedobootsflottille)
Luchs - Kapitänleutnant Eckart Prolss
Seeadler - Kapitänleutnant Werner Hartenstein
Wolf - Kapitänleutnant Lutz Gerstung
 U 25 - Oberleutnant zur See Georg Heinz Michel: refitting
 At Brunsbüttel
Gneisenau (battleship) - Kapitän zur See Erich Förste: Flottenflaggschiff
 At Kiel
Schlesien {Linienschiff} - Kapitän zur See Kurt Utke
 Admiral Hipper (heavy cruiser) - Kapitän zur See Hellmuth Heye:  refitting
 Blücher (heavy cruiser) - {Kapitän zur See Heinrich Woldag}:  finishing at Deutsche Werke, commissioned September 20
 Erich Koellner (Z 13)  - Fregattenkapitän Alfred Schulze-Hinrichs:  outfitting
 Hermann Künne (Z 19)  - Fregattenkapitän Friedrich Kothe
 Wilhelm Heidkamp (Z 21)  - Korvettenkapitän Hans Erdmenger:  outfitting
5. Torpedobootsflottille - Fregattenkapitän Rudolf Heyke:
Albatros - Kapitänleutnant Herbert Max Schultze
Falke - Kapitänleutnant Günter Hessler
Greif - Kapitänleutnant Wilhelm Verlohr
Kondor - Kapitänleutnant Hans Wilcke
Möwe - Kapitänleutnant Konrad Edler von Rennenkampf
 U 2 - Kapitänleutnant Helmut Rosenbaum:  refitting
 U 8 - Kapitänleutnant Georg Peters:  refitting
 U 10 - Kapitänleutnant Georg-Wilhelm Schulz:  refitting
U 13 - Kapitänleutnant Karl Daublebsky von Eichhain: rearming / departs September 2 (Nordsee)
 U 16 - Kapitänleutnant Hannes Weingaertner:  rearming / departs September 2 (Nordsee)
 U 20 - Kapitänleutnant Karl-Heinz Moehle:  rearming / departs September 1 (Nordsee)
 U 24 - Kapitänleutnant Udo Behrens:  rearming / departs September 2 (Nordsee)
 U 49 - Kapitänleutnant Curt von Gossler:  training
 U 51 - Kapitänleutnant Dietrich Knorr:  training
 U 53 - Kapitänleutnant Ernst-Gunther Heinicke:  training
 U 60 - Kapitänleutnant Georg Schewe:  training
U 61 - Kapitänleutnant Jurgen Oesten:  training
 At Hamburg
Erich Giese (Z 12)  - Korvettenkapitän Karl Smidt
 At Bremen
Anton Schmitt (Z 22)  - {Korvettenkapitän Friedrich Böhme}: finishing at DeSchiMAG, commissioned September 24
U 42 - Kapitänleutnant Rolf Dau: training
U 43 - Kapitänleutnant Wilhelm Ambrosius: training
 At Neustad
Unterseebootsschulflottille - Kapitänleutnant Heinz Beduhn:
U 1 - Kapitänleutnant Jurgen Deecke
U 3 - Kapitänleutnant Joachim Schepke
U 4 - Kapitänleutnant Harro von Klot-Heydenfeldt
U 11 - Kapitänleutnant Viktor Schultze: refitting?

Marinegruppenkommando Ost
Oberbefehlshaber Marinegruppenkommando Ost - Generaladmiral Conrad Albrecht

 Kommandierender Admiral der Marinestation der Ostsee - Admiral Rolf Carls
 At sea (Baltic)
1. Zerstörerflottille - Kapitän zur See Wilhelm Meisel:
Georg Thiele (Z 2) - Korvettenkapitän Max-Eckart Wolff
Richard Beitzen (Z 4) - Korvettenkapitän Moritz Schmidt (Flag 1. Zerstörerflottille)
Erich Steinbrinck (Z 15) - Korvettenkapitän Rolf Johannesson
 U 5 - Kapitänleutnant Gunter Kutschmann
 U 6 - Kapitänleutnant Joachim Matz
 U 7 - Oberleutnant zur See Otto Salmann
 U 14 - Kapitänleutnant Horst Willner
 U 18 - Kapitänleutnant Max-Hermann Bauer
 U 22 - Kapitänleutnant Werner Winter
 U 31 - Kapitänleutnant Wilfred Prellberg:  Ostsee
 U 32 - Korvettenkapitän Paul Buchel:  Ostsee / returning to Kiel
 U 35 - Kapitänleutnant Werner Lott:  Ostsee / returning to Kiel
 U 57 - Kapitänleutnant Claus Korth
 At Danzig
Schleswig-Holstein (Linienschiff) - Kapitän zur See Gustav Kleikamp
 Wolfgang Zenker (Z 9)  - Korvettenkapitän Gottfried Ponitz
 Bernd von Arnim (Z 11)  - Korvettenkapitän Kurt Rechel
 At Pillau
Friedrich Eckoldt (Z 16)  - Korvettenkapitän Alfred Schemmel
 Leberecht Maas (Z 1)  - Korvettenkapitän Fritz Bassenge (Flag Führer der Torpedoboote Konteradmiral Gunther Lütjens)
 At Stettin
Max Schulz (Z 3)  - Korvettenkapitän Claus Trampedac:  damaged in collision and not operational
 At Swinemünde
Bruno Heinemann (Z 8)  - Korvettenkapitän Fritz Berger
 Friedrich Ihn (Z 14)  - Korvettenkapitän Rudolf von Pufendorf

See also
Polish army order of battle in 1939
Invasion of Poland
Waffen-SS Order of Battle
Wehrmacht

Notes

References

External links 
 Lexikon der Wehrmacht
  The Luftwaffe, 1933-45

World War II orders of battle
Invasion of Poland